Built Like That is the debut spoken word CD of the internationally acclaimed folk poet and spoken word artist Alix Olson. It was originally released on  under the label of Subtle Sister Productions.

Track listing
"Eve's Mouth"
"Daughter"
"Cute for a Girl"
"Built Like That"
"Deadbeat Daddy"
"America's On Sale"
"Checking My Pulse"
"Subtle Sister"
"The Compliment"
"Dear Mr. President"
"Warriors"
"Myth" 
"Sticks"
"Hit It Girls"
"Armpit Hair (Mammally Factual)"
"Witches"
"Picnic Table"
"Popcorn and Laughter"
"Gender Game"
"Criminal"
"Cunt Cuntry"
"I Believe"

2001 albums
Alix Olson albums